Malavan Bandar Anzali Football Club (Bashgah-e Futbal-e Milâvan Bendâr Anzeli) is an Iranian football club based in Bandar-e Anzali, Iran. It currently won Iran's second football league, the Azadegan League and came back to Persian Gulf Pro League after they were relegated in 2015–16 season. The team is known to have some of the most passionate fans in Iranian football, and is one of the successful teams that is not based in Tehran. 
This team is one of the most successful Iranian teams in the Hazfi Cup. Malavan has reached the Hazfi Cup final 7 times and has 3 titles.

The club forms the football part of the multisport Malavan Sport and Cultural Club. Malavan was previously owned by the Iranian Navy.

History

Establishment
Bahman Salehnia created the team in 1968 along with some young athletes from the port city of Anzali. After some time, the Iranian Navy decided to become the team's main sponsor and owner.

Early years

The club never really had great success in the league but they were able to become the best non-Tehran based club and finishing third in the 1977 and 1989. Malavan has won the Hazfi Cup on 3 occasions. In 1988 Malavan participated in Asian Club Championship but after beating Saunders SC in first round they withdrew from tournament due to the Iran–Iraq War.

Iran Pro League
In 2003 Malavan was relegated to the Azadegan League, they only stayed one year in the lower league as they were immediately promoted back to the Iran Pro League. Since then, they have been one of the most stable teams of the league in recent years where they only had few coaches during their history and always finished in mid table and challenge the big teams. They finished 12th in the 2008–09 and 2009–10 season. In 2010–11 season they finished 8th and reached the final of Hazfi Cup but lost to Persepolis. In the 2013–14 Iran Pro League season Malavan achieved a surprising 7th-place finish in the league, their highest ever.

Relegation
In July 2015 Malavan hired famous Iranian coach Amir Ghalenoi who had won several league titles with Esteghlal and Sepahan. Player such as Arash Afshin, Hossein Mahini and Shahab Karami joined the squad to serve their conscription period. In Ghalenoi's first game in charge, Malavan defeated the Hazfi Cup holders, Zob Ahan 1–0. After only three games Ghalenoi left the club and was replaced by former Persepolis manager Hamid Estili.

On 13 May 2016 after a 2–0 loss to Siah Jamegan, who were behind Malavan before the match started, the clubs was relegated to the Azadegan League for the second time in their history.

Before the start of the 2016–17 season it was announced that controversial manager Mohammad Mayeli Kohan had been named Malavan's manager. Despite achieving good results and being in or near a promotion spot the entire season, Mayeli Kohan was involved in several confrontations with the supporters, which led to many supporters boycotting the team's games.

El Gilano

The match between Malavan and Damash or Sepidrood is known as the Gilan Derby or El Gilano. This match is one of Iran's most important and heated derby's. Malavan hold the record for most wins in the derby with four since the start of the Iran Pro League in 2001. Malavan also holds the largest margin of victory when they defeated Damash 3–0 in 2005 and again in 2013. The derby is also known for its fan violence.

Season-by-season
The table below chronicles the achievements of Malavan in various competitions since the beginning of Iranian Pro league in 2001.

For details on seasons, see List of Malavan F.C. seasons

Individual records

Top scorers
Top scorers of the club in the 
Iran Pro League era, bold indicates present player.

Honours

National titles
Azadegan League
Winners (1): 2021–22
Runner-up (1): 2003–04
Hazfi Cup
Winners (3): 1975–76, 1986–87, 1990–91
Runner-up (4): 1987–88, 1988–89, 1991–92, 2010–11

Minor titles
 Vahdat Cup
Third place (1): 1982
 RCD Cup
Runner-up (1): 1974

Club officials

Presidents
Sources:

Current coaching staff
Source:

Head coaches
Below is a list of Malavan coaches from 1968 until the present day.
Firouz Karimi carries the honor of being the first Iranian head coach to assume the title without rising from the Malavan football school.

Players

First-team squad

Loan list

For recent transfers, see List of Iranian football transfers summer 2022.

Notes

References
Malavan FC stats at persianleague.com (archived)

External links
Persian League- Latest Iran League News – Iran Football News
  

Football clubs in Iran
Association football clubs established in 1969
Sport in Gilan Province
1969 establishments in Iran
Malavan F.C.